Gabriel Preil (Hebrew: גבריאל פרייל; August 21, 1911 – June 5, 1993)  was a modern Hebrew poet active in the United States, who wrote in Hebrew and Yiddish. Preil translated Robert Frost and Walt Whitman into Hebrew.

Biography
Gabriel (Yehoshua) Preil  was born in Tartu, Livonia, Russian Empire in 1911, but was raised in Krakės, Kovno until his father died. He then moved with his mother to the United States in 1922. Though primarily influenced by Yiddish poets of the Inzikh (Introspective) movement, Preil's influence extends to younger Israeli poets (Dan Pagis nicknamed him "The Duke of New York"), and Israelis were his primary audience.  Preil lived with his mother and step-father in the Bronx, NY, until their deaths.  In 1975, he received on honorary Doctorate of Hebrew Letters from Hebrew Union College.   Preil died in Jerusalem on June 5, 1993 while visiting on a book tour.

Poems
Many of Preil's poems focus on New York city, Maine, and his grandfather, a rabbi, who lived in Lithuania and wrote for Ha-Melitz.  One of his poems is dedicated to the Israeli poet Leah Goldberg: "Leah's Absence". Another references Abraham Mapu; others, Jacob Glatstein and Mendele Mocher Sforim.

Yael Feldman writes of Preil's Yiddish and American atmosphere, "One could say that Preil's life and art are a manifestation of two diametrically opposite movements: His physical biography led him further away from Israeli soil, but, through his artistic activity, he tenaciously bridged the distance and successfully approached the contemporary sources of his poetic medium.  In order to do this, he had to cross two language barriers: Yiddish, his European mother tongue, which continued to be the language spoken at home throughout his life, and English, the language he acquired in his new home-country and which soon became a rich literary source for young Preil, the avid reader."

References

Further reading
The Modern Hebrew Poem Itself, T. Carmi, ed. (2003), 
Sunset Possibilities and Other Poems (Jewish Poetry Series), Trans. Robert Friend. (1986-02) 
To Be Recorded (1994-04) 
Modernism and Cultural Transfer: Gabriel Preil and the Tradition of Jewish Literary Bilingualism. Yael S. Feldman. Cincinnati: Hebrew Union College Press, 1986.

External links
 Gabriel Preil's poems in English translation at Poems Found in Translation

1911 births
1993 deaths
Hebrew-language poets
Yiddish-language poets
American people of Estonian-Jewish descent
Estonian Jews
Estonian male poets
Jewish poets
Jewish American writers
Writers from Tartu
20th-century Estonian poets
20th-century male writers
20th-century American Jews
Lithuanian emigrants to the United States